Arabis glabra, commonly known as tower rockcress or tower mustard, is a tall, slim, grey-green plant with small creamy flowers at the top of the stem. It usually grows on poor chalky or sandy soils, in open situations. It is native to Europe, Asia, and North Africa, and it is widespread in North America where it is also probably native. It can be found in many other parts of the world as an introduced species.

It is classified as an endangered species in the UK and is considered to be facing a very high risk of extinction in the wild. It is listed as a Priority Species under the UK Biodiversity Action Plan. Only 35 sites are recorded by Plantlife mostly in Norfolk, (where 100 plants were found at a new site in 1999) but includes 6 sites near Kidderminster in Worcestershire.

References

External links
Plantlife International UK Site: Arabis glabra-Tower mustard accessed 24.12.07
Express and Star £10k project to protect rare flower 20 December 2007 11.33am accessed 24.12.07
USDA Plants Profile
Photo gallery

glabra
Flora of Europe
Flora of Asia
Flora of North Africa
Flora of North America
Plants described in 1753
Taxa named by Carl Linnaeus